Mississippi Highway 25 (MS 25) runs from I-55 in Jackson, Mississippi to the Tennessee state line north of Iuka. The largely controlled-access part from Jackson to Starkville connects the state capital with the main campus of Mississippi State University.

History
The 1933 Road Map of Mississippi shows MS 25 running northward from Macon roughly along the 2019 alignment of U.S. Route 45 to Brooksville, then roughly along the 2019 alignment of U.S. Route 45 Alternate through Artesia and West Point to Muldon, where the 2019 alignment continues in a northeasterly direction.

As of June 28, 2006,  of continuous four-lane divided highway is open between Starkville, Mississippi,  and Jackson, Mississippi. This is one of the culminations of the 1987 Four-Lane Highway Program (commonly referred to as AHEAD Program) for improving Mississippi roadways.

Legally, Mississippi 25 is defined in Mississippi Code Annotated § 65-3-3, as follows: "Begins at or near Jackson, Hinds County, thence in a northeasterly direction to or near Carthage, Louisville and Starkville, thence along U.S. 82 to its intersection with U.S. 45A, thence along U.S. 45A to Muldon, thence to or near Aberdeen, Amory, Smithville, to U.S. 78, thence continuing to Belmont, Dennis, Tishomingo, Iuka and to the Mississippi-Tennessee state line north of Cross Roads, Tishomingo County."

Major intersections

See also

References

External links

 Magnolia Meanderings

025
Transportation in Hinds County, Mississippi
Transportation in Rankin County, Mississippi
Transportation in Leake County, Mississippi
Transportation in Winston County, Mississippi
Transportation in Oktibbeha County, Mississippi
Transportation in Lowndes County, Mississippi
Transportation in Clay County, Mississippi
Transportation in Monroe County, Mississippi
Transportation in Itawamba County, Mississippi
Transportation in Tishomingo County, Mississippi